Magdalena Sadłecka (born 17 March 1982) is a Polish mountain biker. 

She was born in Łódź. She competed at the 2004 Summer Olympics, in women's cross-country cycling.

References

External links 
 

1982 births
Living people
Sportspeople from Łódź
Polish female cyclists
Olympic cyclists of Poland
Cyclists at the 2004 Summer Olympics
21st-century Polish women